Nigel Brian Kyeremateng (born 29 January 2000) is an Italian professional footballer who plays as a winger for  club Gelbison.

Club career
Born in Novara, Kyeremateng started his career in Monza and AC Milan Primavera teams. He joined to local club Novara in 2017, and made his professional debut in Serie C on 12 December 2018 against Alessandria. He left Novara on 2 February 2021 by mutual consent.

On 10 February 2021, he signed with Serie C club Teramo.

On 12 January 2022, he was loaned to Fermana.

On 5 September 2022, Kyeremateng moved to Gelbison, newly promoted to Serie C.

International career
Kyeremateng played two matches for Italy U16 in 2015.

Personal life
His brothers Giovanni Kyeremateng and Basty Kyeremateng are also footballers. He is of Ghanaian descent.

References

External links
 
 

2000 births
People from Novara
Sportspeople from the Province of Novara
Footballers from Piedmont
Italian people of Ghanaian descent
Living people
Italian footballers
Association football wingers
Italy youth international footballers
Novara F.C. players
U.S. Folgore Caratese A.S.D. players
S.S. Teramo Calcio players
Fermana F.C. players
Serie C players
Serie D players